The Skopska Crna Gora dialect is a member of the western subgroup of the northern group of dialects of Macedonian. The dialect is spoken in a small territory north of Skopje on the hem and at the foot of the mountain Skopska Crna Gora. The name of the dialect is derived from the name of the mountain . The Skopska Crna Gora dialect is spoken in the villages: Kučkovo, Orman, Volkovo, Novo Selo, Brazda, Gluvo, Čučer, Gornjane, Banjane, Mirkovci, Kučevište, Pobožje, Brodec, Ljubanci, Ljuboten, Raštak, Gorno Orizari, Radišani, Bulačani, Cresevo and Stajkovci.

Phonological characteristics
 use of A instead of E: / > / ('grass'), / > / ('nut');
 retained use of ъ Big Yer: / > / ('lie');
 use of U instead of the Old Church Slavonic letter ON: / > / ('road'), / >  / ('nephew').

Morphological characteristics
 use of the letter V between vowels: / > / ('that')
 palatal J before the letter E at the beginning of a word: / > / ('tongue'),  >  ('rope');
 the consonant group MN is replaced with the consonant group ML: / > / ('too much');
 use of the preposition U instead of the preposition VO: / > / ('in city')

Typical words

There are many words which are typical of the Skopska Crna Gora dialect.
 / instead of / ('flat')
 / instead of / ('this')
 / instead of /

References

Dialects of the Macedonian language
Čučer-Sandevo Municipality